Lyot is a large peak ring crater in the Vastitas Borealis region of Mars, located at 50.8° north latitude and 330.7° west longitude within the Ismenius Lacus quadrangle.  It is 236 km in diameter. Its name refers to Bernard Lyot, a French astronomer (1897–1952).

Lyot crater, featuring a central peak in the middle, stands out on the flat plains of Vastitas Borealis, which is generally flat and smooth with few large craters. Lyot is the deepest point in the northern hemisphere of Mars. To the south are the Deuteronilus Mensae, and further to the southeast are Protonilus Mensae. To the west is the smaller Micoud crater, and to the east-southeast is Moreux crater.

Research published in 2009 describes evidence for liquid water in Lyot in the past.

Many channels have been found near Lyot Crater.  Research, published in 2017, concluded that the channels were made from water released when the hot ejecta landed on a layer of ice that was 20 to 300 meters thick.  Calculations suggest that the ejecta would have had a temperature of at least . The valleys seem to start from beneath the ejecta near the outer edge of the ejecta.  One evidence for this idea is that there are few secondary craters nearby. Few secondary craters were formed because most landed on ice and did not affect the ground below.   The ice accumulated in the area when the climate was different.  The tilt or obliquity of the axis changes frequently.  During periods of greater tilt, ice from the poles is redistributed to the mid-latitudes.  The existence of these channels is unusual because although Mars used to have water in rivers, lakes, and an ocean, these features have been dated to the Noachian and Hesperian periods—4 to 3 billion years ago.

Former rivers 

Images from Mars Reconnaissance Orbiter show valleys carved by rivers on the floor of Lyot crater. Scientists are excited because the rivers seem to have formed more recently than others on Mars; water could have flowed in them only 1.25 million years ago. The source of the water is believed to have been ice from nearby glaciers.

Dust devil tracks 
Many areas on Mars, including Lyot, experience the passage of giant dust devils.  A thin coating of fine bright dust covers most of the Martian surface.  When a dust devil goes by it blows away the coating and exposes the underlying dark surface.  These dust devils have been seen from the ground and high overhead from orbit.

Gallery

Interactive Mars map

See also 
 List of craters on Mars

References

External links 

Impact craters on Mars
Ismenius Lacus quadrangle